Æthelbert II (725–762) was king of Kent. Upon the death of his father Wihtred, the kingdom was ruled by his three sons, Æthelbert II, Eadberht I and Alric. Æthelbert seems to have outlived both of his brothers and later reigned jointly with his nephew Eardwulf. He died in 762, according to the Anglo-Saxon Chronicle (recorded under 760 due to chronological dislocation). He seems to have left a son, Eadberht II.

He issued a charter before his accession, dated 11 July 724, that was witnessed by his father. As king he issued further charters, confirmed a charter of his brother Eadberht I, and witnessed a charter of his nephew Eardwulf.

During the latter half of Æthelberht II's rule, Kent was under the overlordship of Mercia, but Æthelberht II maintained his position as king.

See also
 List of monarchs of Kent
 Chronology of Kentish Kings

Footnotes

External links
 

762 deaths
Kentish monarchs
725 births
8th-century English monarchs